Serhiy Kosovskyi (born 19 May 1998 in Kyiv, Ukraine) is a Ukrainian football midfielder who plays for VPK-Ahro.

Career
Kosovskyi is a product of Dynamo Kyiv from his native city.

In 2016 he signed contract with Vorskla Poltava and continued his career as player in the Ukrainian Premier League Reserves. In April 2017 he was promoted to the main-squad team of Vorskla in the Ukrainian Premier League. He made his debut as a substituted player for Vorskla Poltava in the Ukrainian Premier League in a match against Volyn Lutsk on 5 May 2017.

Personal life
Kosovskyi is a son of the retired Ukrainian international footballer Vitaliy Kosovskyi.

References

External links
 
 

1998 births
Living people
Footballers from Kyiv
Ukrainian footballers
Ukraine youth international footballers
Ukrainian expatriate footballers
Association football midfielders
FC Vorskla Poltava players
FC Obolon-Brovar Kyiv players
FC Ahrobiznes Volochysk players
Slávia TU Košice players
FC VPK-Ahro Shevchenkivka players
Ukrainian Premier League players
Ukrainian First League players
Expatriate footballers in Slovakia
Ukrainian expatriate sportspeople in Slovakia
4. Liga (Slovakia) players